The following article presents a summary of the 2006 football (soccer) season in Brazil, which was the 105th season of competitive football in the country.

Campeonato Brasileiro Série A

São Paulo declared as the Campeonato Brasileiro champions.

Relegation
The four worst placed teams, which are Ponte Preta, Fortaleza, São Caetano and Santa Cruz, were relegated to the following year's second level.

Campeonato Brasileiro Série B

Atlético Mineiro declared as the Campeonato Brasileiro Série B champions.

Promotion
The four best placed teams, which are Atlético Mineiro, Sport, Náutico and América-RN,  were promoted to the following year's first level.

Relegation
The four worst placed teams, which are Paysandu, Guarani, São Raimundo and Vila Nova, were relegated to the following year's third level.

Campeonato Brasileiro Série C

Criciúma declared as the Campeonato Brasileiro Série C champions.

Promotion
The four best placed teams in the final stage of the competition, which are Criciúma, Vitória, Ipatinga and Grêmio Barueri, were promoted to the following year's second level.

Copa do Brasil

The Copa do Brasil final was played between Flamengo and Vasco.

Flamengo declared as the cup champions by aggregate score of 3–0.

State championship champions

Youth competition champions

Other competition champions

Brazilian clubs in international competitions

Brazil national team
The following table lists all the games played by the Brazil national football team in official competitions and friendly matches during 2006.

Women's football

Brazil women's national football team
The following table lists all the games played by the Brazil women's national football team in official competitions and friendly matches during 2006.

The Brazil women's national football team competed in the following competitions in 2006:

Domestic competition champions

References

 Brazilian competitions at RSSSF
 2006 Brazil national team matches at RSSSF
 2004-2007 Brazil women's national team matches at RSSSF

 
Seasons in Brazilian football
Brazil